Farhad Zarif (born 3 March 1983, Mashhad) is an Iranian volleyball player who plays for Paykan Tehran and he's a previous player of Iran national team. Zarif was invited to national team in 2006.

Honours

National team
Asian Championship
Gold  medal (2): 2011, 2013
Asian Games
Gold medal (1): 2014
Asian Junior Championship
Gold medal (1): 2002
Asian Youth Championship
Gold medal (1): 2001
World Youth Championship
Silver medal (1): 2001

Club
Asian Championship
Gold medal (2): 2016, 2017 (Sarmayeh Bank)

Individual awards
Best Digger: 2001 Asian Youth Championship
Best Receiver: 2001 World Youth Championship
Best Receiver: 2002 Asian Junior Championship
Best Receiver: 2003 World Junior Championship
Best Libero: 2006 Asian Club Championship
Best Libero: 2007 Asian Club Championship
Best Libero: 2009 Asian Club Championship
Best Libero: 2011 Asian Championship
Best Libero: 2012 Olympic Qualification Tournament
Best Libero: 2013 Asian Championship
Best Libero: 2013 FIVB World Grand Champions Cup

References

Scoresway
FIVB profile

External links 

 Zarif on Instagram
 Zarif on Facebook

Sportspeople from Mashhad
Iranian men's volleyball players
1983 births
Living people
Asian Games gold medalists for Iran
Asian Games medalists in volleyball
Volleyball players at the 2006 Asian Games
Volleyball players at the 2014 Asian Games
Medalists at the 2014 Asian Games
21st-century Iranian people
Islamic Solidarity Games competitors for Iran